The Ice House Comedy Club is a comedy club located at 24 Mentor Avenue in Pasadena, California.

The Ice House continues to thrive and during its many decades of operation has entertained over four million people.

History
It was opened in 1960 by Willard Chilcott who, soon after, took on folk music icon Bob Stane as his partner.

From 1960 to 1978, The Ice House, originally managed by Keith Pearce, aka, O'Brien, was a folk music club with acts coming from around the country to perform. During that same time, many comedians also appeared at the club. In 1978, the original owners were bought out by a trio of investors led by Bob Fisher who changed the format of the club to stand-up comedy.

Notable people 
Among performers who have recorded some of the more than 75 live albums at the club are the Smothers Brothers, Gallagher, Lily Tomlin, Pat Paulsen, Richard Jeni and George Lopez.

Other comedians who have performed at the Ice House include: Bob Newhart, George Carlin, Robin Williams, David Letterman, Jim Carrey, Jay Leno, Dennis Miller, Howie Mandel, Jerry Seinfeld, Billy Crystal, Steve Martin, Ellen DeGeneres, Garry Shandling, Sinbad, Bill Hicks, Bill Maher, Gabe Kaplan, Paula Poundstone, Rosie O'Donnell, Cheech & Chong, Tim Allen, Paul Rodriguez, Dana Carvey, Joey Diaz, Arsenio Hall, Joe Rogan, Bill Burr, Chris D’Elia, Bert Kreischer, Theo Von, and Ken Jeong.

References

External links

Comedy clubs in California
Event venues established in 1960
1960 establishments in California
Tourist attractions in Pasadena, California
Buildings and structures in Pasadena, California